Carlos A. Paz de Araújo (born in Natal) is a Brazilian American scientist and inventor with nearly 600 patents registered in his name. Most of them are associated with nanotechnology, particularly a ferroelectric memory chip (FeRAM)

Career and inventions 
As a professor of electrical and computer engineering at the University of Colorado at Colorado Springs, Paz de Araujo's work led to the development of integrated circuit-embedded FeRAMs used in smart cards, electronic money and other products.

As a founder of RAMTRON and chairman and founder of Symetrix Corporation, both in Colorado Springs, Colorado, he identified SrBi2Ta203 (SBT), the ferroelectric material used in the most advanced FeRAMs.  This material resolves the fatigue problem and fabrication difficulties in memory chips and ensures that stored information is retained.

Paz de Araujo and his colleagues were the first to use ferroelectric thin-films as a high-k capacitor for cellular phones, integrated on a set of gallium arsenide chips. The resulting devices were 50 times smaller and drew a fraction of the power of their predecessors. Working with scientists at Matsushita Electric Industry Company in Japan, he then adapted SBT technology to contactless smart cards that permit information to be continuously upgraded during use.

He is the editor of Integrated Ferroelectrics, and chairman of the International Symposium on Integrated Ferroelectrics.  He has edited two books on integrated ferroelectrics and is the author or coauthor of more than 290 papers on ferroelectrics.

He has bachelor's, master's and doctoral degrees in Electrical Engineering from the University of Notre Dame in South Bend, Indiana.

He was the first Brazilian to win the Institute of Electrical and Electronics Engineers IEEE Daniel E. Noble Award. Panasonic, the Japanese electronics giant, has acquired 9% of the equity of his company, Symetrix Corporation.

References

External links
 IEEE - 2006 Daniel E. Noble Award
 University of Notre Dame - Notre Dame Triple Domer Wins 2006 IEEE Daniel E. Noble Award

Brazilian scientists
Living people
People from Natal, Rio Grande do Norte
IEEE award recipients
Brazilian expatriate academics in the United States
Year of birth missing (living people)